Freya Waley-Cohen (born 20 February 1989) is a British-American composer based in London.

Biography
Waley-Cohen grew up in an arts-oriented family. Her mother is the American sculptor Josie Spencer and her father is English theatre manager and producer Stephen Waley-Cohen. Her sister is the violinist Tamsin Waley-Cohen. She began playing the violin at the age of three, and at aged 11 enrolled for a composition course at The Walden School, New Hampshire. She studied with Giles Swayne whilst an undergraduate at Cambridge, and then afterwards with Simon Bainbridge and Oliver Knussen at the Royal Academy of Music. In 2016 she was a Composition Fellow at the Tanglewood Festival.

Music
An early composition was Dark Hour, a piano quintet with clarinet, performed at the Sage Gateshead in May 2013. The choral piece Linea was written specifically for performance inside the Princess of Wales Conservatory glass house at Kew Gardens, an installation as much as a concert piece. It was performed there by the vocal ensemble Reverie in October 2014. Similarly Permutations (2017), for six recorded violins, is also site-specific. It was written to be performed inside a specially constructed building at the Aldeburgh Festival, created with architectural designers Finbarr O’Dempsey and Andrew Skulina. The six violin parts were recorded separately and the sound distributed around the building.

The song cycle Happiness for soprano and orchestra was the last piece Waley-Cohen worked on with her teacher Oliver Knussen before his death in July 2018. It premiered at St Luke Old Street on 19 October 2018, played by the London Symphony Orchestra with soloist Lauren Fagan. Ink for large ensemble, recorded by the Philharmonia Orchestra on the NMC label, was inspired by the poetry collection Bottled Air by Caleb Klaces (who also provided the text for Linea). Changeling, a 10-minute work for chamber orchestra, was commissioned by the Los Angeles Philharmonic and premiered on 1 June 2019 by the LA Phil New Music Group at the Walt Disney Concert Hall, conducted by John Adams.

Her BBC Proms debut came with a performance of the octet Naiad at Cadogan Hall by the Knussen Chamber Orchestra, led by Ryan Wigglesworth, on 9 September 2019. Conjure, a string trio, was commissioned by the Wigmore Hall and given its first performance at the hall on 2 November 2019 by the Albion Quartet. Spell Book for chamber orchestra was commissioned by the Britten Sinfonia and first performed on 21 January 2020 in Cambridge. Spell Book (Volume 2) for soprano and string quartet was premiered at Conway Hall on 1 March 2020.

In March 2022 the premiere of her hour-long opera WITCH took place at the Royal Academy of Music as part of its 200th anniversary celebrations. Freya was composer in residence with the London Chamber Orchestra for the 2021-22 season, where performances of her works included Saffron and Happiness as well as the new work Pocket Cosmos, written for the orchestra.

Works

References

External links
 Freya Waley-Cohen website
 Recordings on Soundcloud
 Performance of Conjure by the Albion Quartet, Wigmore Hall, 2 November, 2019
 Documentary about the world premiere performance of Linea at Kew Gardens, October 2014
 Freya Waley-Cohen on This Classical Life, BBC Radio 3

British women classical composers
21st-century classical composers
21st-century British composers
21st-century English women musicians
1989 births
Living people
21st-century women composers
Daughters of baronets
Waley-Cohen family